Van Buyten is a surname that may refer to:

 Daniel Van Buyten (born 1978), Belgian football player
 Hendrick van Buyten (1632-1701), Dutch baker

Surnames of Dutch origin